Mathias Herrmann (born 16 July 1962 in Friedberg, West Germany) is a German television actor.
He studied acting from 1983–86 at the rewarded Otto-Falckenberg-School in Munich. Parallel to his studies he already played at the Munich Kammerspiele. His film debut he had given in 1987 in  	Ralf Huettner's successful movie The Girl with the Lighters.

After this, he had many engagements at theatres in Bremen, Bonn, Mannheim and Basel, where he played many leads in which he excited the audience, a.o. Prinz von Homburg, Clavigo, Der Stellvertreter and Ghetto. He got international attention with the lead role of captured German soldier Beck in the Dutch WW2 series De Partizanen (The Partisans), which received many awards and was nominated for an emmy. Shortly after this he also had a successful outcome in television in the ZDF series Ein Fall für Zwei. Millions of people were watching him in the role of Dr. Johannes Voss.

Since then Mathias Herrmann was playing leads in many successful and awarded German TV movies, like Messerscharf (Angeliki Antoniou), E-mail an Gott (Bernd Böhlich), Sperling (Peter Schulze-Rohr), Verliebte Jungs (Christoph Schrewes), Das Phantom (Dennis Gansel), Das falsche Opfer (Ulrich Stark) and Dieter Kehler's film version of Rosamunde Pilcher's Land der Sehnsucht. He has performed readings from authors such as Villon, Goethe and Schiller, Hebel and Brecht, Agota Kristof and Robert Gernhardt for many years.

Filmography

External links

Heppeler Agency 

1962 births
Living people
German male television actors
German male stage actors
20th-century German male actors
21st-century German male actors
People from Friedberg, Hesse